Aethes kyrkii is a species of moth of the family Tortricidae. It is found in northern Finland.

References

kyrkii
Endemic fauna of Finland
Moths described in 2003
Moths of Europe